Diastrophus is a genus of gall wasps in the family Cynipidae. There are at least eight described species in Diastrophus.

Species
These eight species belong to the genus Diastrophus: 
 Diastrophus colombianus Nieves-Aldrey, 2013 n ( gall on Rubus glaucus)
 Diastrophus cuscutaeformis b (blackberry seed gall wasp)
 Diastrophus kincaidii Gillette, 1893 b
 Diastrophus mayri Reinhard, 1876 g
 Diastrophus nebulosus b (blackberry knot gall wasp)
 Diastrophus potentillae Bassett, 1864 i c g b
 Diastrophus rubi (Bouché, 1834) i c g
 Diastrophus turgidus Bassett, 1870 i c g
Data sources: i = ITIS, c = Catalogue of Life, g = GBIF, b = Bugguide.net n = ResearchGate

References

Further reading

 
 
 

Cynipidae
Articles created by Qbugbot
Taxa named by Theodor Hartig
Gall-inducing insects

Hymenoptera genera